The 1993 First Union 400 was the seventh stock car race of the 1993 NASCAR Winston Cup Series season and the 43rd iteration of the event. The race was held on Sunday, April 18, 1993, before an audience of 45,000 in North Wilkesboro, North Carolina at the North Wilkesboro Speedway, a  oval short track. The race took the scheduled 400 laps to complete. At race's end, Penske Racing South driver Rusty Wallace would manage to pull away in the final one-fourth of the race to take his 24th career NASCAR Winston Cup Series victory and his third victory of the season. To fill out the top three, SABCO Racing driver Kyle Petty and Hendrick Motorsports driver Ken Schrader would finish second and third, respectively.

Background 

North Wilkesboro Speedway is a short oval racetrack located on U.S. Route 421, about five miles east of the town of North Wilkesboro, North Carolina, or 80 miles north of Charlotte. It measures  and features a unique uphill backstretch and downhill frontstretch. It has previously held races in NASCAR's top three series, including 93 Winston Cup Series races. The track, a NASCAR original, operated from 1949, NASCAR's inception, until the track's original closure in 1996. The speedway briefly reopened in 2010 and hosted several stock car series races before closing again in the spring of 2011. It was re-opened in August 2022 for grassroots racing.

Entry list 

 (R) denotes rookie driver.

Qualifying 
Qualifying was split into two rounds. The first round was held on Friday, April 16, at 2:00 PM EST. Each driver would have one lap to set a time. During the first round, the top 20 drivers in the round would be guaranteed a starting spot in the race. If a driver was not able to guarantee a spot in the first round, they had the option to scrub their time from the first round and try and run a faster lap time in a second round qualifying run, held on Saturday, April 17, at 12:15 PM EST. As with the first round, each driver would have one lap to set a time. For this specific race, positions 21-32 would be decided on time, and depending on who needed it, a select amount of positions were given to cars who had not otherwise qualified but were high enough in owner's points; up to two were given. If needed, a past champion who did not qualify on either time or provisionals could use a champion's provisional, adding one more spot to the field.

Five drivers would fail to qualify.

Full qualifying results

Race results

Standings after the race 

Drivers' Championship standings

Note: Only the first 10 positions are included for the driver standings.

References 

First Union 400
First Union 400
NASCAR races at North Wilkesboro Speedway
April 1993 sports events in the United States